Sahale Mountain is a jagged, glaciated mountain, in North Cascades National Park, in northern Washington state. The summit of Sahale Mountain is referred to as Sahale Peak. Quien Sabe Glacier is to the west of the ridge between the two peaks while Davenport Glacier is in a cirque east of this ridge and above Horseshoe Basin. Sahale Glacier is south of the summit and east of Sahale Arm, a ridge that extends southwest from Sahale to Cascade Pass. The name Sahale may originate from a Northwest Native American word meaning "high place," "falcon," or "sacred."

Climbing
Sahale Peak is noted for its panoramic views and is popular among mountaineers. The least technical route follows the Sahale Arm from the Cascade Pass Trail to the Sahale Glacier. From the glacier there is a  3–4 climb to the summit. Another option is to traverse from the Sahale Arm onto the Quien Sabe Glacier and climb the glacier to the rock ridge north of the peak. The climb up this ridge is also class 3–4 but crosses some loose rock and is more exposed. Cascade Pass and the Sahale Arm can be reached from Marblemount to the west or from the east, it is accessible via a trail, from Stehekin, up the Stehekin River valley.

Climate

Sahale is located in the marine west coast climate zone of western North America. Most weather fronts originate in the Pacific Ocean, and travel northeast toward the Cascade Mountains. As fronts approach the North Cascades, they are forced upward by the peaks of the Cascade Range, causing them to drop their moisture in the form of rain or snowfall onto the Cascades (Orographic lift). As a result, the west side of the North Cascades experiences high precipitation, especially during the winter months in the form of snowfall. During winter months, weather is usually cloudy, but, due to high pressure systems over the Pacific Ocean that intensify during summer months, there is often little or no cloud cover during the summer.

Geology

The North Cascades features some of the most rugged topography in the Cascade Range with craggy peaks and ridges, deep glacial valleys, and granite spires. Geological events occurring many years ago created the diverse topography and drastic elevation changes over the Cascade Range leading to various climate differences.

The history of the formation of the Cascade Mountains dates back millions of years ago to the late Eocene Epoch. With the North American Plate overriding the Pacific Plate, episodes of volcanic igneous activity persisted. In addition, small fragments of the oceanic and continental lithosphere called terranes created the North Cascades about 50 million years ago.

During the Pleistocene period dating back over two million years ago, glaciation advancing and retreating repeatedly scoured the landscape leaving deposits of rock debris. The U-shaped cross section of the river valleys are a result of recent glaciation. Uplift and faulting in combination with glaciation have been the dominant processes which have created the tall peaks and deep valleys of the North Cascades area.

References

External links

 
 
 
 
 

Mountains of Chelan County, Washington
Mountains of Washington (state)
North Cascades of Washington (state)
Mountains of Skagit County, Washington